Be Love is a Japanese monthly (bimonthly May 1982 – 2018) manga magazine targeting women published by Kodansha.  It debuted in September 1980. It is one of the leading manga magazines for adult women, the second of its kind (the first being Petit Comic published by Shogakukan), and was instrumental in the rising popularity of josei manga in the 1980s, which led to the creation of other magazines targeted at women such as You and Big Comic for Lady. As of 2003, Be Love, like You and Jour, published stories focusing on "the reality of everyday life" experienced by its readers.

As of 1997, the magazine's readers are mostly working women and housewives, but students made up 8% of readership in that year.

Circulation figures
The magazine first appeared as Be in Love but was renamed in 1982.  From 1995 to 2000 sales were at around 270,000-280,000 per issue.  In 2006 and 2007, Be Love had a circulation of about 200,000 copies.  In 2008, it had a circulation of 182,667 copies. In 2009, it had a circulation of 173,125 copies; in 2010, 153,792 copies, and in 2015, 106,834 copies.

As of 1997, the magazine's readers are mostly working women and housewives, but students made up 8% of readership in that year.

Series

Ongoing series 

Couverture by Yuki Suetsugu (since 2009)
Kamakura Bake Neko Club by Daisuke Igarashi (since 2022)
Nina the Starry Bride by Rikaichi (since 2019)
Okoshiyasu, Chitose-chan by Yukiko Natsume (since 2016)
Seito Shokun! Saishū-shō: Tabidachi by Yōko Shōji (since 2011)
Something's Wrong with Us by Natsumi Ando (since 2016)
Tsukuyomi-kun no Kindan Oyashoku by Nikki Asada (since 2021)
Yuria-sensei no Akai Ito by Kiwa Irie (since 2018)

Past series 
Aishite Sou Rou by Yuu Azuki
Aishiteru: Kaiyō by Minoru Itō (2006–2007)
Aka-chan no Host by Ai Okaue
Akuryou-sama Oteyawaraka ni by Chikako Kikukawa
Asameshimae by Kita Komao
Atokata no Machi by Yuki Ozawa
Bara to Saiaku no Tamashii by Satosumi Takaguchi
Chihayafuru by Yuki Suetsugu (2007–2022)
Chihayafuru: Chuugakusei-hen by Yui Tokiumi, Oto Tooda
Daisuki!! Yuzu no Kosodate Nikki by Mizuho Aimoto (2005–2012)
Door wo Aketara Satsui by Chikako Kikukawa
Eien no Yuuwaku
Fukufuku Fu-nya~n by Kanata Konami
Fukufuku Fu-nya~n: Koneko da Nyan by Konami Kanata
Fukufuku Fu-nya~n New by Kanata Konami
Galboy! by Mariko Nakamura (1988-1998)
Glass no Isu by Mariko Nakamura
Haiji to Yamao by Natsumi Ando
Haru Koi by Yuki Suetsugu (2007)
Himawari!!: Sorekawa no Daisuki!! by Mizuho Aimoto
It's All About the Looks by Hiromi Ookubo (2013-2017)
Houkago Karte by Mayu Hinase
Ishtar no Musume: Ono Otsuu Den by Waki Yamato
 Junjou no Susume by Miki Wakabayashi
Kagami no Mae de Aimashou by Eri Sakai
Kentaro Hiyama's First Pregnancy by Eri Sakai (2012, 2023)
Kentaro Hiyama's Pregnancy: Childcare Edition by Eri Sakai (2019-2020)
Kiko-chan's Smile by Tsubasa Nunoura (1996–2001)
Kosodate Tantan by Banana Nangoku
Kumo Ichizoku to Doro Girl by Emi Mitsuki
Kurenai Niou by Waki Yamato
Lady Love: Aisuru Anata e by Hiromu Ono (2005–2010)
Meiji Hiiro Kitan by Rikachi
Meiji Melancholia by Rikachi
Minamoto Hakase no Ijou na xx by Miyuki Yorita
Momokan by Kikuno Shirakawa
Navigatoria by Nikki Asada
Nishi Muku Samurai by Waki Yamato
Onna no Ie by Akane Torikai
Otomurai-san by Noriko Ootani
Peach Girl Next by Miwa Ueda (2016–2019)
Pikupiku Sentarou by Tsubasa Nunoura
Saihate Arcade by Arinaga Ine, Youko Ogawa
Sanju Mariko by Yuki Ozawa (2016-2021)
Sankaku Yanemachi Apartment by Sakura Fujisue
Satsujin Sales by Chikako Kikukawa
Seito Shokun! Kyōshi-hen by Yōko Shōji (2004–2011)
Shikatsushi: Joou no Houigaku by Aki Morino
Shoujo Manga wa Okirai desu ka? by You Morita
Shouwa Fanfare by Rikachi
Shunkashuutou Days by Sakura Fujisue
Shura no Dress by Miyuki Yorita
Sukutte Goran by Noriko Ootani
Tasogare Takako by Kiwa Irie
Uchi no Sensei by Yuu Hanazuka
Waru by Jun Fukami (1988–1997)
Watashi no Tadashii Onii-chan by Satoshi Mori
Watashitachi wa Douka shiteiru by Natsumi Ando
Yandeka by Miyuki Yorita
Yonimo Fujitsu na Piano Sonata by Hal Osaka
 Zephyrus no Mori by Waki Yamato

References

External links
Official website

1980 establishments in Japan
Kodansha magazines
Josei manga magazines
Women's magazines published in Japan
Magazines established in 1980
Magazines published in Tokyo